Zack Snyder's Justice League (colloquially referred to as the Snyder Cut) is the 2021 director's cut of the 2017 American superhero film Justice League, the fifth film set within the DC Extended Universe (DCEU) based on the team of the same name appearing in DC Comics publications. It is intended to match director Zack Snyder's original vision for the film, prior to his departure from the production and subsequent studio interference. The film follows Batman (Ben Affleck), Wonder Woman (Gal Gadot), Cyborg (Ray Fisher), Aquaman (Jason Momoa), The Flash (Ezra Miller), and a revived Superman (Henry Cavill) as they form an alliance to stop the extradimensional New God Steppenwolf (Ciarán Hinds) and his army of Parademons from conquering Earth for his overlord Darkseid (Ray Porter).

Released by Warner Bros. Pictures in 2017, Justice League had a difficult production. Its script underwent major changes before and during production between 2016 and 2017. In May 2017, Snyder stepped down during post-production following the death of his daughter, Autumn Snyder, and Joss Whedon was hired to finish the film, completing it as an uncredited director. Whedon oversaw reshoots and other changes that incorporated a brighter tone and more humor while reducing the runtime significantly in accordance with a mandate from Warner Bros. The theatrical version polarized critics and underperformed at the box office; this resulted in Warner Bros. opting to prioritize developing future films around individual characters, with less regard for consistency and continuity within the wider shared universe.

Many people expressed interest in Snyder's version of the film, which they often referred to as the "Snyder Cut". Although most industry insiders reported its release unlikely, Warner Bros. moved ahead with it in February 2020; in May, Snyder announced it would be released as Zack Snyder's Justice League as a HBO Max Original Film. $70 million was spent to complete the visual effects, score and editing, with new material being shot in October 2020. The release was originally planned as both a six-episode miniseries and a long feature-length film, with the former concept being cancelled in January 2021 in favor of releasing it as the latter. The film is dedicated to the memory of Autumn Snyder.

Zack Snyder's Justice League was released on HBO Max in the United States on March 18, 2021. It became the fourth-most-streamed film on the platform that year. The film was widely considered superior to the 2017 theatrical release, and critics praised Snyder's direction, visual style, action sequences, performances, improved characterizations, musical score, and balance of emotional weight and humor, although the runtime received some criticism.

Plot 

Thousands of years ago Apokoliptian warlord Darkseid and his Parademon attempt to conquer the Earth using three devices called Mother Boxes, but he is foiled by an alliance of the "Old Gods", Amazons, Atlanteans, humans, and a Green Lantern. Darkseid flees, leaving behind the Boxes, which the Amazons, Atlanteans, and humans each guard. In the present, the death of Superman at the hands of Doomsday triggers the Boxes' reactivation, attracting Steppenwolf, Darkseid's disgraced lieutenant. Steppenwolf aims to regain Darkseid's favor by gathering the boxes to form "The Unity", which would terraform Earth into a copy of their homeworld.

Steppenwolf reaches Themyscira through a portal and fights the Amazons to obtain their Mother Box. Diana Prince receives a warning from the Amazons, then learns about Darkseid's assault on Earth and Steppenwolf. She informs Bruce Wayne, as the two are seeking to form a team of metahumans in order to protect the planet. After failing to recruit Arthur Curry, Bruce locates Barry Allen, while Diana locates the cyborg Victor Stone. Barry joins while Victor refuses until his father, Silas, and other S.T.A.R. Labs employees are kidnapped by Parademons who seek the humans' Mother Box. Steppenwolf kidnaps and kills Atlantean guards watching over their Mother Box and takes it, with only Mera and a reluctant Arthur surviving the encounter.

The team receives intelligence from Gotham City Police Commissioner James Gordon, leading them to Steppenwolf's forces in an abandoned underwater facility. Although the team rescues several kidnapped employees, the facility is flooded, trapping them until Arthur helps them escape. Victor retrieves the last Mother Box, which he had hidden. He reveals that it was used to rebuild his body after a car accident, explaining that the Boxes can rearrange matter at the will of their users. The group realizes they could resurrect Superman using the box, though Steppenwolf will detect its use. Meanwhile, Steppenwolf receives a vision of the Anti-Life Equation on Earth, a secret power sought by Darkseid to control all of existence, and informs him. The team exhumes Clark Kent's body and places it in the amniotic fluid of the genesis chamber in a Kryptonian ship. After Barry activates the Mother Box, an amnesiac Clark is resurrected, attacking the group after Victor's cybernetics targets him in self-defense. Right as he is about to kill Batman, Lois Lane arrives to calm him down. They travel to his family home in Smallville, where he regains his memories. Steppenwolf retrieves the last Mother Box, but Silas sacrifices himself to supercharge it with laser heat, allowing Victor to track it.

Without Superman, the five heroes travel to an abandoned Russian city, where Steppenwolf aims to form the Unity. They fight their way through the Parademons, with Superman arriving in time to subdue Steppenwolf. Victor fails to prevent the Unity, however, and the planet begins to break apart. Barry enters the Speed Force before the shockwave reaches him, reversing time and giving Victor the necessary charge that allows him and Superman to prevent the Unity. Wonder Woman decapitates Steppenwolf, sending his head to Darkseid on Apokolips through an opened portal. Darkseid vows to return to Earth to find the Anti-Life Equation.

In the epilogue, Bruce, Diana, and Alfred make plans to set up a headquarters for the team at the desolated Wayne Manor. Bruce helps Clark settle back in at home, before resuming his double life in Metropolis. Arthur briefly meets Vulko and Mera before riding off to see his father, and Barry informs his erroneously convicted father in prison that he has acquired a job in Central City's police department. Victor is inspired by an audio message left by his father to realize his purpose in life, while Diana contemplates returning home to Themyscira.

Meanwhile, Lex Luthor has escaped from Arkham Asylum and is visited on his yacht by Slade Wilson, to whom he reveals Batman's secret identity. In an additional scene before the credits, Bruce awakes from an apocalyptic dream of the future and receives a visit from the Martian Manhunter, who thanks him for assembling the team before promising to be in contact to prepare for Darkseid's return.

Cast

 Ben Affleck as Bruce Wayne / Batman: A wealthy socialite, the owner of Wayne Enterprises, and co-founder of the Justice League. He dedicates himself to protecting Gotham City from its criminal underworld as a highly trained, masked vigilante equipped with various tools and weapons. Director Zack Snyder described Affleck's Batman as on a path of redemption in Zack Snyder's Justice League, feeling guilty due to his actions in Batman v Superman: Dawn of Justice (2016).
 Henry Cavill as Clark Kent / Superman: A Kryptonian survivor with superpowers and a journalist for the Daily Planet based in Metropolis. He is the inspiration for the Justice League, which he becomes a member of. In 2018, Cavill described Superman as he appears in Snyder's Justice League as coming closer to completing his character arc that began with Man of Steel (2013) and becoming the "true" Superman as depicted in the comics. Snyder said while he loves the traditional portrayals of the character, he wanted Superman to have a realistic arc and develop as a character, and not be a "one-dimensional Boy Scout".
 Amy Adams as Lois Lane: A reporter for the Daily Planet and the love interest of Clark Kent.
 Gal Gadot as Diana Prince / Wonder Woman: An immortal demigoddess princess and Amazon warrior. She is a co-founder of the Justice League.
 Ray Fisher as Victor Stone / Cyborg: A former college athlete who, after being cybernetically reconstructed after a nearly fatal car accident, is turned into a techno-organic being enhanced by reactive, adaptive biomimetic alien technology. His enhancements include the abilities of flight, variable weaponry and technopathy. Much of Cyborg's character development was removed in the theatrical release, and Snyder described Cyborg as he is depicted in Zack Snyder's Justice League as "the heart of the movie". Similarly, Fisher stated that Cyborg's character arc is emotional and allegorical of "the journey that Black people have taken in [America]". According to Fisher, the only scene of his directed by Snyder which remained in the theatrical release was that of Cyborg meeting up with Batman and Commissioner Gordon at the Gotham City police rooftop.
 Jason Momoa as Arthur Curry / Aquaman: An Atlantean half-blood with aquatic powers.
 Ezra Miller as Barry Allen / The Flash:A Central City college student pursuing a degree in criminal justice in the hopes of exonerating his father of the murder of his wife, Barry's mother. He is capable of moving at superhuman speeds and entering the Speed Force to time-travel.
 Willem Dafoe as Nuidis Vulko: An Atlantean who acts as Arthur's mentor.
 Jesse Eisenberg as Lex Luthor:Superman's archenemy and former head of LexCorp. Luthor's appearance at the end of the film was originally intended to tease Affleck's now-reworked The Batman project rather than a potential Justice League sequel.
 Jeremy Irons as Alfred Pennyworth: Bruce Wayne's butler who provides tactical support for Batman and the Justice League.
 Diane Lane as Martha Kent: Clark Kent's adoptive mother.
 Connie Nielsen as Queen Hippolyta: Diana's mother and Queen of the Amazons.
 J. K. Simmons as Commissioner Gordon: The Gotham City police commissioner and an ally of Batman.
 Ciarán Hinds as Steppenwolf:A New God military officer from the planet Apokolips who leads an army of Parademons in search of the three Mother Boxes held on Earth. Hinds had previously described Steppenwolf as "old, tired, still trying to get out of his own enslavement to Darkseid". Steppenwolf was redesigned for the new release, bringing his appearance closer to Snyder's original vision.
 Zheng Kai as Ryan Choi: A scientist working at S.T.A.R. Labs, under the leadership of Silas Stone. By the end of the film, Choi is promoted to Director of Nanotechnology at the company. The character was intended to star in a spin-off, with Snyder having pitched a film to the studio, which would have featured Choi taking up the mantle of The Atom, and taken place in China with a Chinese cast.
 Amber Heard as Mera: An Atlantean who was raised by Arthur Curry's mother, Queen Atlanna. Unlike her appearances in the theatrical version and Aquaman (2018), Heard uses a pseudo-Queen's English accent throughout the film.
 Joe Morton as Silas Stone: Victor Stone's father and the head scientist at S.T.A.R. Labs.
 Lisa Loven Kongsli as Menalippe: Hippolyta's lieutenant and Diana's aunt.
 David Thewlis as Ares: The son of the Olympian Old God Zeus and the half brother of Diana Prince. Stuntman Nick McKinless portrays Ares physically, while Thewlis's face is superimposed on McKinless's using CGI.

Ray Porter portrays Darkseid, a tyrannical New God from Apokolips and Steppenwolf's nephew and master. Darkseid did not appear in the theatrical release, meaning Zack Snyder's Justice League marks the character's first appearance in a live-action film. Porter played Darkseid through the use of motion capture and "went through a few different vocal gymnastics trying to figure out the voice". Porter was unfamiliar with the Darkseid character upon being cast, but Snyder and screenwriter Chris Terrio helped guide him with their knowledge of the comic book lore. Peter Guinness portrays DeSaad, Darkseid's master enforcer, who acts as a liaison between Steppenwolf and Darkseid.

Harry Lennix reprises his DCEU role as US Secretary of Defense Calvin Swanwick, whose real identity is revealed as Martian Manhunter. Snyder stated that Swanwick has always been the Martian Manhunter since Man of Steel and has secretly been guiding Clark, Lois, and mankind to do good as he wanted humanity to try and protect Earth themselves before getting directly involved. Jared Leto reprises his role from Suicide Squad (2016) as the Joker, a psychotic criminal and Batman's archenemy, who becomes one of the surviving resistance members in the Knightmare future. The Joker was not planned to appear in the original film, but Snyder decided to use him sometime after his new version was greenlit, as it was always Snyder's intention to bring the Joker into his Justice League films. The character was redesigned for the new release.

Karen Bryson portrays Elinor Stone, Victor Stone's late mother, while Kiersey Clemons portrays Iris West, Barry Allen's future love interest; both actresses' scenes were cut from the theatrical release and restored for Snyder's version of the film. Other actors reprising their roles from previous DC Extended Universe films include: Eleanor Matsuura as Epione, Samantha Jo (who also played the Kryptonian Car-Vex in Man of Steel) as Euboea, Ann Ogbomo as Philippus, Doutzen Kroes as Venelia, Carla Gugino as the Kryptonian ship's voice. Uncredited appearances include Robin Wright as Antiope, Billy Crudup as Henry Allen, Kevin Costner (via archival voice recording and still photograph) as Jonathan Kent, Joe Manganiello as Slade Wilson / Deathstroke and Russell Crowe as Jor-El. In addition to Thewlis and McKinless portraying Ares, Sergi Constance and Aurore Lauzeral portray the roles of other Old Gods, Zeus and Artemis, respectively. Julian Lewis Jones and Francis Magee portray two ancient kings of Earth, credited as the Ancient Atlantean king and the Ancient king of men, respectively. Michael McElhatton appears as Black Clad Alpha, the leader of a group of terrorists who clash with Wonder Woman early in the film. Marc McClure (who portrayed Jimmy Olsen in the original Superman film series) has a brief cameo as Jerry, a police officer who is friends with Lois Lane. Additionally, Green Lanterns Yalan Gur and Kilowog, as well as Granny Goodness through computer-generated imagery (CGI). The latter was modeled after the aunt of a Weta artist named Jojo Aguilar.

History

Production of Justice League

Following the release of Man of Steel (2013), director Zack Snyder outlined the basis of the DC Extended Universe (DCEU), which centered around a five-film arc including Man of Steel, Batman v Superman: Dawn of Justice (2016), and a Justice League trilogy. Snyder's original vision was to have Batman v Superman be the darkest in the franchise, and have subsequent films become lighter in tone. However, Batman v Superman was poorly received, with criticism for its dark tone, lack of humor, and slow pace. Distributor Warner Bros. Pictures and Snyder re-evaluated upcoming DCEU films, particularly Suicide Squad (2016), which had already wrapped principal photography, and Justice League, which was a month away from filming. Snyder and screenwriter Chris Terrio rewrote Justice League to be lighter in tone. Cinematographer Fabian Wagner said Snyder wanted to "get away from the stylized, desaturated, super-high contrast looks of other films in the franchise."

Principal photography for Justice League began in April 2016 and wrapped the following December. Months later, multiple cuts of Snyder's Justice League were shown to Warner Bros. executives, in addition to friends and family of Snyder. A final run-time and picture lock were achieved, though the cuts had incomplete visual effects shots and partial audio mixing. Snyder said that he had multiple cuts that were essentially "done", only needing "a few CG tweaks" to complete. Forbes contributor and film screenwriter Mark Hughes reported that Snyder's cut was more than 90% complete, while The Daily Telegraph cited a visual effects expert as estimating that Warner Bros. would need another $30–40 million to finish the film. Warner Bros. executives who saw Snyder's cut felt that Snyder had made significant efforts to lighten the tone following the criticism of Batman v Superman: Dawn of Justice. Despite this, Warner Bros. was unhappy with the results and insider reports indicated that it considered the cut "unwatchable".

The final scene was originally filmed with John Stewart / Green Lantern portrayed by Wayne T. Carr, but Warner Bros. Pictures rejected the idea as they had other plans for the character. Previously conceived variations of the scene included characters such as Kilowog with John Stewart, Kilowog with Tomar-Re, and Stewart with Martian Manhunter. Snyder opted to change Kilowog to Martian Manhunter, while scrapping the second idea early during post-production back in 2017. Ultimately, Snyder chose the third idea, and filmed the scene on August 2020. WB did not want Stewart to be in the scene, so Snyder decided to compromise with the studio and reshot the scene to only include Martian Manhunter by October 2020. He also reshot Affleck's side of the scene as the previous footage was unusable due to lighting issues. Snyder originally wanted to include Ryan Reynolds, who previously portrayed Hal Jordan in Green Lantern (2011), as an "additional lantern... to fill out the corps a bit", but did not contact him.

Joss Whedon
After disapproving of Snyder's direction, Warner Bros. hired Joss Whedon, who directed the Marvel Cinematic Universe films The Avengers (2012) and Avengers: Age of Ultron (2015), to rewrite the script and help with extensive reshoots. Warner Bros. CEO Kevin Tsujihara mandated that Justice League length was not to exceed two hours. Warner Bros. also decided not to push back the release date so that executives could keep their annual bonuses and partly due to concerns that parent company AT&T might dissolve the studio after an upcoming merger. Snyder was expected to film the scenes that Whedon re-wrote, and they were working together to meet Warner Bros.'s requests when Snyder's daughter, Autumn Snyder, died in March 2017. Though Snyder was initially open to Whedon rewriting the script, he eventually became more resistant as the studio gave Whedon more directing privileges; but as he and his family were dealing with Autumn's death, Snyder did not challenge it.

Snyder continued to work on Justice League for two months to distract himself, before stepping down in May. His wife Deborah Snyder, who was producing Justice League, also left the project. Following his departure, Snyder saved the rough version of the cut, which has not gone through post-production yet, on a hard drive. He kept it as a "memento", so he could show it to friends or "snippets" of footage could be included in a documentary, as he thought that his version would not be released. Rolling Stone reported that Snyder had sent an editor in 2017 to retrieve materials related to the film on a hard drive. He was asked to return them as they were considered to be studio property, but refused to do so as he said the materials were for his “personal use”; he felt the files were his and as such, he was allowed to have them and claimed he was not asked to return them. Sources said that though security was notified, no action was taken as the studio did not expect Snyder would “begin tinkering with an alternate cut of the film”.

Whedon later assumed full control over production, although Snyder retained directorial credit. Whedon added nearly 80 pages to the script, and Wagner estimates that Whedon's cut uses only about 10% of the footage that Snyder shot. Composer Tom Holkenborg completed his film score before being replaced by Danny Elfman halfway through post-production. The scenes that Whedon wrote or re-shot for the theatrical release featured a brighter tone and more humor, and reduced the level of violence seen in Snyder's darker direction. To meet the mandated runtime, more than 90 minutes of Snyder's footage was removed, but the result still adhered to the basic outline of the story. While the initial cut was poorly received by test audiences, the early screening of Whedon's cut scored as high as Wonder Woman (2017), so Warner Bros. decided to move forward with it.

Release and reception of Justice League
Justice League was released theatrically on November 17, 2017. Critics described it as a "Frankenstein" film, obviously the work of two different directors with competing visions. After seeing Whedon's version in late 2017, Deborah Snyder and executive producer Christopher Nolan advised Snyder to "never see that movie", knowing it would "break his heart". Justice League grossed $657.9 million against an estimated $300 million budget. Against an estimated break-even point of as much as $750 million, Deadline Hollywood reported that the film lost Warner Bros. around $60 million. An anonymous Warner Bros. executive stated in February 2021 that even the studio did not like the "stupefying" changes brought to the finished film, criticizing the Black Clad and the Russian family as goofy and pointless additions to the film. The executive affirmed that the finished film felt "awkward" because the studio did not want to admit what a "piece of shit" it had become. Due to the film's poor performance, Warner Bros. decided to move away from Snyder's vision for a shared universe of interconnected films and focus on standalone films and solo franchises instead.

#ReleaseTheSnyderCut movement
Immediately after the theatrical release of Justice League, which later gained the derisive nickname "Josstice League", fans created an online petition to release the "Snyder Cut" that gained more than 180,000 signatures. The movement, which used the hashtag #ReleaseTheSnyderCut on social media, began before fans had any knowledge that a Snyder cut of Justice League actually existed. The movement was ignited by the theatrical version's mixed reviews. Fans knew Snyder had left directorial and editorial duties in Whedon's hands; thus, they assumed Whedon created an inferior film. The circumstances were compared to those of Superman II (1980), whose initial director was also replaced by one who made substantial changes. Some assumed an alternate cut of Justice League was inevitable because some of Snyder's films had been re-released in extended cuts for home media (such as Watchmen (2009) and Batman v Superman), which some critics considered superior to their theatrical version.

Members of the Justice League cast and crew showing support for the Snyder Cut's release included actors Ben Affleck, Gal Gadot, Jason Momoa, Ciarán Hinds, and Ray Fisher, photographer Clay Enos, storyboard artist Jay Oliva, cinematographer Wagner, and Affleck's stunt double Richard Cetrone. Deborah Snyder said executive producers Christopher Nolan and Emma Thomas encouraged the Snyders to make the Snyder Cut: "I think through this process it's been nice, because outside of Chris, Zack hadn't talked to a lot of people." On the two-year anniversary of the theatrical release, cast and crew voiced support through social media. Other film- and comic book-industry figures not related to Justice League also supported the release of a "Snyder Cut", including filmmakers Kevin Smith and Alan Taylor, television producer Steven S. DeKnight, and comic book writers Rob Liefeld, Robert Kirkman and Jerry Ordway. Members of the #ReleaseTheSnyderCut movement engaged in acts of fan activism to promote it. In June 2018, fans reached out to executives at AT&T following a merger between the company and Warner; in June 2019, they reached out to new Warner Bros. CEO Ann Sarnoff, who replaced Tsujihara after his resignation, following that up a month later with a mass letter-writing campaign; and in July 2019 they reached out to the parent company of Warner Bros., WarnerMedia, after the announcement of its new streaming service HBO Max.

Ahead of the 2019 San Diego Comic-Con, a fan launched a crowdfunding campaign with half of the funds to be spent on an advertising campaign (including billboards and a flying banner ad promoting the Snyder Cut), and the other half to be donated to the American Foundation for Suicide Prevention (AFSP). For a similar campaign at the 2019 New York Comic Con, the movement purchased ad space on two billboards over Times Square featuring quotes from members of the cast and crew. In December 2019, the movement rented another flying banner ad, this time passing over Warner Bros. Studios and directly asking Sarnoff to release the Snyder Cut. In January 2020, the movement bought four minutes of ad space advocating for the film's release on a digital banner wrapped around the interior of Riverside Stadium during the FA Cup. Their efforts garnered praise from Snyder and the AFSP. Following the death of Snyder's daughter and his departure from Justice League, fans from the #ReleaseTheSnyderCut movement began campaigns to raise money for suicide prevention. They went on to raise over $500,000 for the AFSP in donations by February 2021. Robert Gebbia, CEO of the AFSP, praised the fan's donations and subsequently released a statement commenting that: "The #ReleasetheSnyderCut Movement has created a true community of support and their encouraging messages of hope will go a long way toward helping others know they are not alone."

Reactions 
Some analysts were not optimistic about the chances for a new release. Shawn Robbins, chief analyst for Boxoffice Pro, suggested the size of the movement was too small to make an impact, stating, "another cut of Justice League just doesn't seem to be something many outside the die-hard fan base are clamoring to see". Industry insiders also called the Snyder Cut's release unlikely. Writer Mario F. Robles, based on his industry connections, said Warner Bros. did not trust Snyder's vision and was not willing to spend millions to finish his cut. Throughout the movement, members of the media referred to the Snyder Cut as "fabled" or "mythical".

Members of the movement have also been described by various journalists as "toxic" for harassing, threatening, and cyberbullying those who expressed contrary opinions about the Snyder Cut. Yohana Desta of Vanity Fair broadly described the act of fans demanding an alternative cut as a "modern pattern of audience demand that is actively making fandoms more toxic", and compared it to the 2017 harassment of Star Wars: The Last Jedi (2017) actress Kelly Marie Tran. In September 2018, former DC Entertainment president Diane Nelson deleted her Twitter account after substantial online harassment by members of the movement. Warner Bros. telephone operators, inundated with regular calls about the "Snyder Cut", were trained to treat them as prank calls. One fan managed to send a text message to Cetrone regarding the existence of the Snyder Cut, which he responded to. However, the fan posted a screenshot with an altered version of the messages, falsely claiming that Cetrone had confirmed the existence of the Snyder Cut.

Brandon Katz of The New York Observer said that the movement was composed of "both toxic DC fans that hurl vitriolic harassment at any and all opposition, and supportive moviegoers that genuinely enjoy Snyder's style and are just hoping to see the conclusion of his trilogy that began with 2013's Man of Steel. As with any contingent, there are both extremists and level-headed individuals in its ranks." Film critic Byron Lafayette, wrote that it was time "For the Zack Snyder fandom to clean house" noting that many of the fandom were passionate supporters of film, but that they had been infested with attention-seekers. Bob Rehak, Swarthmore College Associate Professor and Chair of Film and Media Studies, said that fandoms such as #ReleaseTheSnyderCut revolt when a major change is made to something they love, and that this reaction usually comes from a smaller subsection of the fandom, which "[paints] the whole community with a really broad brush". In July 2022, Rolling Stone reported that WarnerMedia had discovered via internal investigations that "at least 13 percent of the accounts that took part in the conversation about the Snyder Cut were deemed fake, well above the three to five percent that cyber experts say they typically see on any trending topic." Rolling Stone also spoke with more than 20 people involved with both versions of the film, most of whom believe that Snyder was “working to manipulate the ongoing campaign".

Revival 
In March 2019, after months of speculation, Snyder confirmed that his original cut did exist and stated that it was up to Warner Bros. to release it. In November, an insider claimed that Warner Bros. was unlikely to release Snyder's version in any form, calling such hopes a "pipe dream". However, the following month, Snyder posted a photo in his Vero account, showing boxes with tapes labeled "Z.S. J.L. Director's cut", with the caption "Is it real? Does it exist? Of course it does." Robert Greenblatt, then-WarnerMedia chairman and head of HBO Max, stated that discussions surrounding the release of Snyder's Justice League began in late 2019, and that they lasted a few months. The studio first approached Snyder to release his cut unfinished as he had left it, but Snyder objected to doing so and insisted on either finishing it or not releasing it, leading Warner to take some months to decide whether to proceed. According to Snyder, WarnerMedia decided to move forward with the Snyder Cut in February 2020, after chairman Toby Emmerich acknowledged the #ReleaseTheSnyderCut movement and reached out to Snyder.

The Snyders invited executives from Warner Bros., HBO Max, and DC to their home to view the Snyder Cut. Snyder also presented ideas, which included potentially releasing the cut in episodes. Impressed, the executives decided to let the project proceed. Snyder began to reassemble the film's original post-production team to finish the cut. The effort was almost thwarted by the COVID-19 pandemic, which was escalating around the time, but the Snyders pushed to continue with it. Snyder notified the original cast of the undertaking between April and May 2020; according to Snyder, Fisher was the first person he contacted, but initially thought Snyder was joking. On May 20, 2020, Snyder announced during a Q&A after an online watch party of Man of Steel that his cut of Justice League would be released as Zack Snyder's Justice League on HBO Max in 2021. Greenblatt said WarnerMedia tried to get the news out "as quickly as possible" before HBO Max launched on May 27.

The announcement of Zack Snyder's Justice League was celebrated by the #ReleasetheSnyderCut movement, with many fans expressing their enthusiasm on social media. Some Snyder fans uploaded videos of them destroying their DVD and Blu-ray copies of the theatrical release. Many industry figures, such as cast members of Justice League, expressed their gratitude to the fans who supported the release of Snyder's version of the film. However, some journalists expressed concern that WarnerMedia was conceding to fans who had engaged in forms of harassment and trolling during the movement, which they feared would set a negative precedent. Screen Rant wrote that it sent the message that fan pressuring can work to influence film studios, networks, and streaming services. In response to this concern, HBO Max CEO Tony Goncalves reiterated the passion of the fandom and denied such claims, affirming that as a business they listen to demand from consumers.

Snyder, who had not yet seen the theatrical cut, described his cut as "an entirely new thing, and, especially talking to those who have seen the released movie, a new experience apart from that movie". The Snyders felt that being able to finally finish Justice League would bring them closure, and were excited by the prospect of expanding the film's character development. At that point, it was unclear what format Zack Snyder's Justice League would take for the release, whether as a four-hour-long film or a six-part miniseries. The Hollywood Reporter wrote that it was expected to cost $20–30 million to complete the visual effects, score, and editing. However, Greenblatt indicated the release would be "wildly expensive" and cost more than the reported $30 million to complete. On June 2020, Sandra Dewey, president of productions and business operations for WarnerMedia, stated in an interview that they are aiming for an "early to mid-2021" release. In January 2021, Snyder confirmed that work on the cut had been completed.

Additional filming 
While initial reports indicated that there would be no new material filmed, in September 2020, it was revealed that Snyder was preparing to shoot additional footage. Affleck and Fisher reprised their roles for the shoot. The budget was estimated to have increased to $70 million due to the additional filming. Filming began on October 6. Later that month, Amber Heard, Jared Leto, and Joe Manganiello joined the cast to reprise their DCEU roles as Mera, the Joker, and Deathstroke, respectively. Snyder also directed an additional scene with Miller over Zoom while Miller was filming Fantastic Beasts: The Secrets of Dumbledore (2022) in London by sending the crew drawings and diagrams of how he wanted the scene to look. Snyder's video feed played through a stand on a table enabling him to direct Miller and the crew, who filmed the scene on his behalf. Snyder estimated that only four to five minutes of footage was shot.

Differences from the theatrical version

While the basic framework of the story is the same, numerous scenes that were removed by Joss Whedon are restored to expand upon the characters, mythos, and worldbuilding elements. Teases for upcoming films are also present in Snyder's version. Snyder's version does not use any of the scenes shot by Whedon for his version of Justice League. Former Warner Bros. executives Jon Berg and Geoff Johns, who oversaw the production for Whedon's version, had their credits removed for Snyder's.

Snyder stated that his version is not set in the same continuity as Whedon's, which would remain the canonical version of the film. However, Jason Momoa said that Aquaman (2018) takes place after Snyder's version, rather than Whedon's. Similarly, Wonder Woman (2017) director Patty Jenkins said that no DC director considers Whedon's Justice League canonical, and that she had worked with Snyder to ensure Wonder Woman maintained continuity with his film. Despite these sentiments, there are some apparent contradictions between Aquaman and Zack Snyder's Justice League relating to the backstory of the character Mera.

Follow-up movements 
Following the release of the film, fans expressed their appreciation on social media. Fans soon began a new movement, #RestoreTheSnyderverse, which advocated for Warner Bros. to allow Snyder to complete his originally planned Justice League trilogy. Another movement, #ReleasetheAyerCut, also started trending as well, with fans advocating for WB to release director David Ayer's original cut of Suicide Squad (2016). In July 2022, DC Comics artist Jim Lee, who assisted Zack Snyder in the creation of the initial five-film plan, confirmed at San Diego Comic-Con that there were no plans to make more DC projects with Snyder or develop sequels to his Justice League cut. On February 2023, DC Studios co-chairman and CEO James Gunn officially responded to the fan movements calling for Netflix to purchase the production rights for Snyder's Justice League films, stating that neither the service or Snyder himself expressed any interest in completing the projects despite both parties remaining in touch with Gunn.

Music

Tom Holkenborg, also known as Junkie XL, composed the film's score; he had previously worked on the score for the theatrical version of Justice League, before being replaced by Danny Elfman following Snyder's departure and Whedon's arrival. When Holkenborg was rehired to score the film in early 2020, he decided to restart and make a brand new score for the film, which consists of fifty-four tracks and is three hours and 54 minutes long. The length of the score broke the long held 3-hour record of 1959's Ben-Hur by nearly a full hour, becoming the longest musical score in film history. Holkenborg described the score as "fully electronic [at times], and at other times fully orchestral", incorporating elements of rock and trap. The album was released via WaterTower Music on March 18, 2021, the same day as the film's release.

Two tracks from the film's score, "The Crew at Warpower", and "Middle Mass", were released as singles on February 17, 2021, and March 12, 2021, respectively. The soundtrack also makes use of a couple of songs; the beginning of the movie features a traditional Icelandic song "Vísur Vatnsenda-Rósu" by Yong Aus Galeson, while later scenes use the songs "Distant Sky" and "There Is a Kingdom" by Nick Cave and the Bad Seeds; none are included on the soundtrack. Allison Crowe's cover of the Leonard Cohen song "Hallelujah" plays during the end credits as a tribute to Autumn Snyder.

Marketing 
Alongside the announcement of Zack Snyder's Justice League, HBO released posters depicting the six members of the Justice League. Although these posters had previously been used for the 2017 marketing campaign, the HBO ones featured a black-and-white filter and strongly emphasized Snyder's name. Chris Agar of Screen Rant called the filter "a stark contrast from the colorful Justice League posters that were prevalent in the buildup to the theatrical release, which is most definitely an intentional choice to separate the two versions of the movie".

On August 22, 2020, the first teaser was released during the DC FanDome event, which featured a remix of the song "Hallelujah" (1984) by Leonard Cohen. It was considered to be a highly anticipated part of the event, and well received by audiences and critics. The Hollywood Reporter's Richard Newby highlighted ""smaller character moments" in the trailer, and was excited for the character arcs in the film, while also noting that it was a "true continuation of the themes and character arcs" from Snyder's previous DCEU films. Adam B. Vary for Variety opined that the trailer had a "darker and more somber tone" than that of the theatrical version, and considered it a "triumph" for fans who supported the film. In early November, the original teaser was temporarily removed from HBO Max's social platforms due to the expiration of the rights to "Hallelujah". On November 17, the third anniversary of the theatrical release, an updated version of the teaser with new footage was uploaded in black and white on Snyder's Vero account and in color on HBO Max's social media accounts.

On February 14, 2021, the first official trailer for the film released. Both Vary from Variety and Newby from The Hollywood Reporter also commented on this trailer, with Vary writing that it "features a battle of epic proportions between the Justice League and big bad Darkseid", while Newby praised the depiction of Cyborg, Tom Holkenborg's score, and opined that the film is relevant to "our contemporary situation", writing "We’ve given into fear for too long, and as a result, we let evil into our home. So how do we correct that? How do we answer for the mistakes and inadequacies of the past, while preventing the future from fulfilling all of our worst nightmares?". Charles Holmes of The Ringer highlighted Leto's appearance as Joker in the trailer, particularly his line, "We live in a society", and felt that the trailer "doubles down" on Snyder's aesthetics, but was skeptical about if the film would be superior to the theatrical version. On March 14, the final trailer for the film released, with Daniel Kreps at Rolling Stone writing that it features "many of the hallmarks that made Snyder's version of the blockbuster so mythic in the first place".

On March 16, 2021, DC published three variant covers of the film in the comic book issue, Justice League #59, written by Brian Michael Bendis, penciled and inked by David Marquez, and colored by Tamra Bonvillain. The covers were drawn by Lee Bermejo, Liam Sharp, and Jim Lee.

Release

Streaming
Zack Snyder's Justice League was released on March 18, 2021, in the United States. It was initially going to release on September 5, 2021. It is also available to stream on HBO Max in 4K, HDR in both HDR10 and Dolby Vision, and Dolby Atmos. Unlike the theatrical version which was rated PG-13, this version carries an R-rating for "violence and some language". The film was released internationally on several platforms: on HBO Go in select Asian countries; Binge in Australia; Crave in Canada; HBO services in select European countries; on digital services such as Amazon Prime Video and the iTunes Store in France; on KinoPoisk HD in Russia & CIS countries; digital services such as BookMyShow, Hungama Play, Tata Sky and the iTunes Store in India; Neon, Sky Go, and Sky Movies Premiere in New Zealand; and on Now and Sky Cinema in the United Kingdom. The film was also released on HBO Max in Latin America when the service launched on June 29, 2021. A week after the film's HBO Max release, the Justice Is Gray Edition was released on the platform, and in the UK through Sky Cinema on April 30.

Ten days prior to the scheduled debut of the film, HBO Max accidentally released the film to some viewers that were attempting to watch Tom & Jerry (2021). Although the cut's full runtime was locked to Tom & Jerrys 101 minutes, viewers quickly managed to bypass the bug. After more than two hours, it was later fixed.

Limited theatrical release 
While the cut was originally planned to release as a four-part miniseries in addition to a single film, Snyder said on Vero in January 2021 that the cut would be released as a "one-shot". WarnerMedia later confirmed this in a press release, describing Zack Snyder's Justice League as a "full-length [HBO] Max Original feature film". The film is dedicated to Autumn Snyder's memory.

Snyder expressed his interest in screening his film in IMAX theaters in the markets once the COVID-19 pandemic had gotten under control. A black and white version of the film, titled "Justice Is Gray Edition", had an exclusive theatrical release on July 19 with three IMAX screenings in New York City, Los Angeles, and Austin, Texas. Proceeds from the event were donated to a charity for the American Foundation for Suicide Prevention. For the theatrical release of the film, Snyder added a 10-minute intermission into the film accompanied by the score track "The Crew at Warpower". The film was released in an open matte 1.33:1 aspect ratio alongside IMAX 1.43:1.

Home media
The film was released May 24, 2021, on 4K Ultra HD, Blu-ray and DVD in the United Kingdom. It was released on Ultra HD Blu-ray and Blu-ray in Hong Kong, Australia, Germany, and Italy on May 25, May 26, and May 27, 2021, respectively. A limited edition SteelBook was announced for the UK by HMV with pre-orders starting March 22. According to Warner Bros UK, pre-orders for the home media version sold out in the first 20 minutes of releases. It was released in the United States and Canada on September 7 on Blu-ray, DVD, and 4K, and a week later on those same platforms in Canada. The film's U.S. digital release was July 19, 2022.

Reception

Audience viewership
Following its opening weekend, view-tracking app Samba TV reported that 1.8 million American households had watched at least the first five minutes of the film between March 19–21 (only counting smart TVs, not devices). The total was behind the three-day total of DCEU film Wonder Woman 1984 (2.2 million). Samba TV also reported that just one-third of households watched the film in its entirety in a single sitting. Over its first full week of release, the film was watched by 2.2 million US households, with 792,000 (36%) finishing it in one sitting. Over the same timeframe, the HBO Max app was downloaded 64% more and opened 8.9% more than in an average week. Later, Samba TV reported that it was watched in 3.2 million households over the first 17 days and 3.7 million US households after 39 days.

In Canada, the film became the most-streamed content of all time on Crave, with 1.1 million viewers in one week. It also allegedly led to the service growing in subscribers by 12%. In Australia, Zack Snyder's Justice League became the biggest premiere in Binge. In the United Kingdom, where it is streaming via Sky Cinema, the film was viewed by 954,000 households, with 458,000 (48%) watching it in its entirety. In India, where it was released on BookMyShow Stream, about 100,000 homes watched the film in its first weekend. The film went on to become the most rented film of 2021 on that service. In Spain, the film became the 3rd most viewed release of 2021 on HBO Max España. It also became the fourth-most viewed release of 2021 and the most-viewed film on HBO Max Nordic. In Germany, it ranked first during its first full week of release on Netflix and spent seven weeks in its weekly rankings for top 10 most-viewed films.

At the 2021 WarnerMedia Upfront, Warner Media declared the film was "a hit" Max original. Priya Dogra, president of WarnerMedia Entertainment Networks for Europe, the Middle East, Africa and Asia-Pacific stated the film to be a "global phenomenon" during a presentation for HBO Max Europe. According to Whip Media, who track viewership data for the 19 million worldwide users of their TV Time app, the film was the eighth most-streamed-film of 2021. In January 2022, tech firm Akami reported that the film was the second most pirated film of 2021. Variety stated that the film was the fourth most-streamed film of 2021.

Home media sales
The film ranked first on the "NPD Videoscan First Alert" chart for home media sales in the United States during its first week, as well as in the Blu-ray sales. Overall, it sold five times more than the second-ranked The Conjuring: The Devil Made Me Do It. In addition, the trilogy consisting of all three DCEU films directed by Snyder was ranked fourteenth on the Blu-ray sales chart. According to The Numbers, the film sold 107,489 Blu-ray units and 33,820 DVD units in the first week for a revenue of $4.1 million. The Numbers reported the film had made an estimated $15.96 million from domestic video sales, as of May 29, 2022, with 439,547 Blu-rays and 92,599 DVDs sold.

In the second week, the film was ranked second in home media sales as well as the Blu-ray sales, being displaced by Black Widow, which outsold it by four times overall. It sold 71,682 units overall for $2 million according to The Numbers. By the end of September, it ranked third in overall disc sales according to NPD. After dropping to the 29th rank in overall disc sales and the 24th rank in Blu-ray sales by the ninth week, it returned to the top 10 rankings by acquiring the second position overall the next week amidst discounts offered ahead of Black Friday, while also selling the most number of Blu-ray units. According to The Numbers, it sold 51,027 Blu-ray units for $1.4 million during the week.

In the United Kingdom, it ranked first on the Official Film Chart for five weeks. It was the second-highest-selling Blu-ray title of 2021 in the country, selling nearly 26,000 units during the year.

Critical response
The site's critical consensus reads, "Zack Snyder's Justice League lives up to its title with a sprawling cut that expands to fit the director's vision – and should satisfy the fans who willed it into existence." According to Metacritic, which calculated a weighted average score of 54 out of 100 based on 46 critics, the film received "mixed or average reviews". The scores of the film are higher on both sites than what the 2017 film received (39% and 45, respectively).

According to The Hollywood Reporter, critics praised Snyder's direction and characterization, but criticized the film's length. Variety later noted that most critics felt the film was superior to the 2017 version, a sentiment The Hollywood Reporter and TheWrap also agreed with. However, Total Film reported that critical response to the film was mixed, with critics being "divided" on whether or not it was superior to the theatrical version. Rob Harvilla of The Ringer felt that the film is "A Zack Snyder film that 'critics enjoyed', or at least 'grudgingly appreciated'". He further opined both fans and critics "respect" the film due to the nature of its existence.

Robbie Collin of The Daily Telegraph awarded the film a full five stars, praising Holkenborg's score, action sequences, and the characterization, which he felt was improved from the original. He also praised Snyder's overall creative vision for the DCEU, which he felt was unique. Jenna Anderson from ComicBook.com, who rated the film a 4.5 out of 5, also praised the increased characterization, the performances, and Snyder's filmmaking techniques present in the film, while also opining that Snyder created the film out of love for both his daughter and his fans, and went on to describe the film as "well-executed, entertaining story about the power of human connection and inspiration, one that feels both timeless and timely". Writing for Variety, Owen Gleiberman praised Snyder's direction and the uniqueness of the film, which he felt "exudes a majestic sense of cosmic historical evil". He compared it to Peter Jackson's Lord of the Rings trilogy (2001-2003), while also praising the visuals and the characterization. Gleiberman and Variety's Peter Debruge later ranked it as the eighth best film of 2021. Matt Zoller Seitz from RogerEbert.com gave it a 3.5 out of 4, felt that the film was superior to the theatrical version, and praised Snyder's vision, calling it a "brazen auteurist vision", and felt that while that many scenes were lengthened due to the runtime, it was used to improve the characterization and to create a "sense of space and place".

Tom Jorgensen of IGN gave the film an 8 out of 10 rating, calling it a "vindication" for Snyder's vision, while also maintaining that the runtime allowed the film to explore its lore and characters more, with Jorgensen focusing on character work, which he felt was superior to that of the theatrical version, writing "Nearly every character in Zack Snyder’s Justice League, from the top down, has a clearer journey and more dimension". In a more critical review, Bilge Ebiri of Vulture felt that the film "contains the best and worst of Zack Snyder". He asserted that the film was personal to Snyder, and it contained a lot of his style. Despite opining that Cyborg's character arc consists of "broad, basic emotions", he also felt it was the "best stuff in the film" and praised Snyder's work on the film. However, he also criticized the action, which she felt was over reliant on CGI, slow-motion scenes, and the story, calling it "least interesting part". Eric Kohn at IndieWire graded the film a C, and also reiterated the sentiment that the film "undeniably represents the singular vision" of Snyder. He criticized the runtime, which he believed lengthened a simplistic plot. Elaborating on this, he felt the subplots were "cheesy" and negatively compared the worldbuilding to that of the Marvel Cinematic Universe (MCU), though he praised the cinematography and Cyborg's characterization, and felt the film also offered "occasional dashes of intrigue and inspired visual conceits". Mick LaSalle of San Francisco Chronicle gave the film a positive review, writing that the increased runtime improved the characters, and emphasizing that it was superior to the theatrical version. He concluded that it "may not be a great film, but it has the madness, strangeness and obsessiveness of a real work of art".

The Hollywood Reporter's John DeFore gave the film a negative review. Though he acknowledged that the plot, tone, and visual effects were superior to the theatrical version, he criticized the runtime and dialogue, opining that it "largely maintains a testosterocious monotony from its first chapter". Writing for The New Yorker, Richard Brody criticized the runtime with scenes he felt to be "chopped down to a bare informational minimum, leaving no room for thought or emotion". Additionally, he criticized the visual effects and perceived the characterization to be a "trivialization, manipulation, and deformation of the sincere and serious emotions that undergird and motivate its cast of heroes". While Richard Trenholm, writing for CNET, praised the performances, he thought the film was bloated, feeling that there was an excess of scenes that "any responsible editor would trim without a moment's hesitation", and perceived the tone to be overly serious. In a 1.5/4 star review for The New York Observer, Siddhant Adlakha wrote that "the film's improvements are hardly enough to fix what was, now quite apparently, a flawed endeavor from the start." The BBC's Mark Kermode described the film as "turgid and bloated", further deeming the director's cut "uniformly boring as opposed to before when it was fractured and disjointed boring." Hannah Strong of Little White Lies gave a 2 out of 5 rating, concluding that it "is overlong, miserable and signifies nothing other than the potential of fandom to influence top-level creative decision-making."

Accolades
In February 2022, the film was named one of the five finalists for the new Oscars Cheer Moment Twitter Sweepstakes as part of the Academy of Motion Picture Arts and Sciences' "Oscars Fan Favorite". The scene "The Flash Enters the Speed Force" finished in first place.

See also
Superman II: The Richard Donner Cut

Notes

References

External links

Zack Snyder's Justice League on HBO Max

Zack Snyder's Justice League at DC Universe Infinite

2021 action adventure films
2020s English-language films
2020s superhero films
2021 science fiction action films
Alien invasions in films
Alternative versions of films
American action adventure films
American crossover films
American post-apocalyptic films
American science fiction action films
American superhero films
Apocalyptic films
Atlas Entertainment films
Cyborg films
DC Extended Universe films
Dune Entertainment films
Fiction set in the 3rd millennium BC
Films about extraterrestrial life
Films about mermaids
Films about time travel
Films directed by Zack Snyder
Films produced by Charles Roven
Films produced by Deborah Snyder
Films scored by Junkie XL
Films set in 2017
Films set in a fictional country
Films set in Iceland
Films set in Kansas
Films set in London
Films set in Russia
Films set in the United States
Films set on fictional islands
Films set on fictional planets
Films set on oceans
Films shot at Warner Bros. Studios, Leavesden
Films shot in Greece
Films shot in Iceland
Films shot in London
Films using motion capture
Films with screenplays by Chris Terrio
Films with screenplays by Zack Snyder
HBO Max films
Justice League (film)
Resurrection in film
The Stone Quarry films
Superhero crossover films
Warner Bros. films
2020s American films